Project Greenlight is an American documentary television series focusing on first-time filmmakers being given the chance to direct a feature film.  It was created by Alex Keledjian, developed by Eli Holzman and produced by Ben Affleck, Matt Damon, Sean Bailey, and Chris Moore through their production company LivePlanet, along with Miramax Films. Project Greenlight first aired on HBO for two seasons (aired 2001–03) before moving to Bravo for season three in 2005. The series returned in 2015 for a fourth season airing on HBO. On July 26, 2016, the series was canceled. In May 2021, HBO Max picked up the series with an 8-episode order and will be produced by Issa Rae through her production company Hoorae Media.

Episodes

Season 1 (2001–02)
The script contest ran from September 2000 to March 2001. Over 7,000 screenplays were submitted, and Pete Jones was selected as the winner for Stolen Summer, which he then filmed on location in his hometown of Chicago during the summer of 2001.  The first season of Project Greenlight, helmed by show runner and co-executive producer Liz Bronstein, chronicled the selection of Jones's script and the filming of the movie, aired on HBO from late 2001 through early 2002. Stolen Summer premiered at the Sundance Film Festival in January 2002, then went on to a limited theatrical release which brought in just under $140,000.

Season 2 (2003)
For its second run, the contest was split into two categories: writing and directing. The winners were chosen on January 18, 2003. Erica Beeney won the writing contest for her script The Battle of Shaker Heights, and Kyle Rankin and Efram Potelle won the directing contest.  The film stars Shia LaBeouf, Elden Henson, Amy Smart, and William Sadler. The series aired in the summer of 2003, detailing the production of the film in Los Angeles.  The Battle of Shaker Heights opened in limited theatrical release on August 24, 2003, earning just under $280,000 during its box office run.

Season 3 (2005)
Script submission began and ended during February 2004. After two seasons on HBO, the series moved to Bravo and season three began airing on March 15, 2005.

The selected screenplay was a horror script titled Feast written by Marcus Dunstan and Patrick Melton. The director was John Gulager. The film stars Balthazar Getty, Krista Allen, Jason Mewes, and Eric Dane and was produced by Dimension Films and Neo Art & Logic.

The film ran for a special late night showing on September 22 and 23, 2006, almost a year after its premiere. Feast earned just under $690,000 during its box office run. The DVD was released on October 17, 2006, earning an additional $4,687,595. The film spawned two sequels: Feast II: Sloppy Seconds and Feast III: The Happy Finish

Season 4 (2015)

On April 2, 2015, Project Greenlight announced the first annual Greenie award winners.

Best Comedy: Heist – Director: Brianna Lux and Tony Lazzeroni
Best Drama: A Room for Aden – Director: Douglas Yablun
Best Action: Stan Lee Parkour – Director: Tom Grey
Most Unique: Listen – Director: Joshua Ortiz
Best Horror: The Table – Director: Shane Free
Most "WTF": Pink Shorts – Director: Jeff Huston

In September 2015, Project Greenlight became the subject of controversy when an episode aired of Matt Damon disagreeing with producer Effie Brown over the subject of diversity. A later controversy developed over the titling of the season's sixth episode as "Hot Ghetto Mess" involving Brown's attempt to make sure one of the films did not partake in racial stereotypes, which was to be corrected before airing and replaced with "The Pivot", but was never resolved before airtime.

Awards and nominations

Australia

Series 1
In 2005, Project Greenlight Australia was launched with Pay-TV Movie Network in partnership with Screentime producing the show and offering the A$1,000,000 financing to the winning film. The entries were received online with last entries being accepted on February 14. The screenplay selected from the 1200 submissions was Solo by Morgan O'Neill.

Series 2
In 2006, comedian and filmmaker Paul McDermott hosted the series. The screenplay selected from the 700 submissions was The View from Greenhaven by The MacRae Brothers.

Notes
 The episode "The Pivot" was originally titled "Hot Ghetto Mess."  However, the scene contextualizing the title was removed in last-minute editing. The original title was not corrected for television listings before air due to what was described as a "production error" by HBO.  Future airings, along with HBO Go/HBO Now use "The Pivot" as the episode's title.

References

External links
  at HBO
 

2000s American documentary television series
2010s American documentary television series
2001 American television series debuts
2015 American television series endings
HBO original programming
HBO Max original programming
Television series by Miramax Television
Bravo (American TV network) original programming
English-language television shows
American television series revived after cancellation
Television series about filmmaking
Hoorae Media